The president of the Constitutional Court of Italy holds the fifth-ranking public office of the Italian Republic.

Presidents of the Constitutional Court
 

Italy
Italy